Marital life of Fatima portrays the marriage of Fatima, daughter of the Islamic prophet Muhammad, and Muhammad's cousin, Ali. Fatima and Ali were both significant figures in early Islam: Fatima has been compared to Mary, the mother of Jesus, especially in Shia Islam. Muhammad is said to have regarded her as the best of woman and the dearest person to him. Ali was the fourth of the Rashidun Caliphs and the first Shia Imam. Muhammad is widely reported to have likened Ali's position in Islam to that of Aaron in Judaism.

Marriage 
Fatima married Muhammad's cousin Ali in 1 or 2 AH (623-5 CE), possibly after the Battle of Badr. There is evidence in Sunni and Shia sources that some of the companions, including Abu Bakr and Umar, had earlier asked for Fatima's hand in marriage but were turned down by Muhammad, who said he was waiting for the moment fixed by destiny. It is also said that Ali was reticent to ask Muhammad to marry Fatima on the account of his poverty. When Muhammad put forward Ali's proposal to Fatima, she remained silent, which was understood as a tacit agreement. On the basis of this report, woman's consent in marriage has always been necessary in Islamic law. Muhammad also suggested that Ali sell his shield to pay the bridal gift.

Muhammad performed the wedding ceremony, and they prepared an austere wedding feast with donations from Madinans. Shia sources have recorded that Fatima donated her wedding gown on her wedding night. Later the couple moved into a house next to Muhammad's quarters in Medina. Their marriage lasted about ten years until Fatima's death. Fatima's age at the time of her marriage is uncertain, reported between nine and twenty-one. Ali is said to have been about twenty two.

Significance 
Among others, the Sunni al-Suyuti ascribes to Muhammad, "God ordered me to marry Fatima to Ali." According to Veccia Vaglieri and Klemm, Muhammad also told Fatima that he had married her to the best member of his family. There is another version of this hadith in the canonical Sunni collection Musnad Ahmad ibn Hanbal, in which Muhammad lauds Ali as the first in Islam, the most knowledgeable, and the most patient of the Muslim community. Nasr writes that the union of Fatima and Ali holds a special spiritual significance for Muslims for it is seen as the marriage between the "greatest saintly figures" surrounding Muhammad.

Married life 
As with the majority of Muslims, the couple lived in severe poverty in the early years of Islam. In particular, both had to do hard physical work to get by. Shia sources elaborate that Ali worked at various jobs while Fatima was responsible for domestic chores. Their financial circumstances later improved after more lands fell to Muslims in the Battle of Khaybar. Fatima was at some point given a maidservant, named Fidda.

Following the Battle of Uhud, Fatima tended to the wounds of her father and regularly visited the graves to pray for those killed in the battle. Later Fatima rejected Abu Sufyan's pleas to mediate between him and Muhammad. Fatima also accompanied Muhammad in the Conquest of Mecca.

Bint Abu Jahl 

Ali did not marry again while Fatima was alive. However, al-Miswar ibn Makhrama, a companion who was nine when Muhammad died, appears to be the sole narrator of an alleged marriage proposal of Ali to Abu Jahl's daughter in Sunni sources. While polygyny is permitted in Islam, Muhammad reportedly banned this marriage from the pulpit, saying that there can be no joining of the daughter of the prophet and the daughter of the enemy of God (Abu Jahl). He is also said to have praised his other son-in-law, possibly Uthman or Abu al-As. Soufi notes that the reference to the third caliph Uthman might reflect the Sunni orthodoxy, in which Uthman is viewed as superior to his successor Ali.

Buehler suggests that such Sunni traditions that place Ali in a negative light should be treated with caution as they mirror the political agenda of the time. In Shia sources, by contrast, Fatima is reported to have had a happy marital life, which continued until her death in 11 AH. In particular, Ali is reported to have said, "Whenever I looked at her [Fatima], all my worries and sadness disappeared."

Offspring 
Fatima and Ali were survived by four children: Hasan, Husayn, Zaynab and Umm Kulthum. In particular, Muhammad was very fond of his grandsons, who are regarded the second and third of the Twelve Imams. Widely reported is his statement that Hasan and Husayn would be the lords of the youth of the paradise. Controversy surrounds the fate of their third son, Muhsin: Shias hold that Muhsin died in a miscarriage, following a raid on Fatima's house ordered by the first caliph, Abu Bakr. Sunnis, on the other hand, believe that Muhsin died in infancy of natural causes. It is through Fatima that Muhammad's progeny has spread throughout the Muslim world.

See also 
 Ahl al-Kisa
 Ahl al-Bayt
 Family tree of Ali
 Family tree of Muhammad

References

Sources 

 
 
 
 
 
 
 
 
 \

External links 
 
 

Fatimah